The Internet Wrestling 19 (IW19) Championship was a women's professional wrestling championship owned by the Ice Ribbon promotion. The championship was introduced on the March 22, 2011, episode of Ice Ribbon's  Ustream program, where Tsukushi defeated Tsukasa Fujimoto in the finals of a tournament to become the inaugural champion. Championship matches had a 19-minute time limit, and, unlike with all other Ice Ribbon championships, in the event of a time limit draw, the champion retained the title. The title was originally defended exclusively on the 19 O'Clock Girls ProWrestling program.

History

Originally, 19 O'Clock Girls ProWrestling was kept separate from Ice Ribbon, but on August 26, 2011, the program was brought under the Ice Ribbon banner and the IW19 Championship recognized as an Ice Ribbon championship. With the move, the title underwent some changes, including an addition of a nineteen-year age limit and a three-year experience limit and the abolishment of a rule, where a champion must defend the title at least once every four weeks. However, in January 2012, the age and experience limits were seemingly abandoned, when Hamuko Hoshi, 29 years old, Lady Afrodita, 21 years old, Maki Narumiya, 25 years old, Sayaka Obihiro, 25 years old, Tomoki Yagami, 29 years old, and Tsukasa Fujimoto, 28 years old, all entered a number one contender's tournament. During the next ten months, the IW19 Championship was defended once every ten weeks against the winner of an eight-woman single-elimination tournament. On January 7, 2013, Ice Ribbon officially put 19 O'Clock Girls ProWrestling on hiatus as it considered the future of the program, following the departure of its original operator, Sayaka Obihiro. On May 18, Ice Ribbon announced a 19 O'Clock Girls ProWrestling event for June 22, which would see the first defense of the IW19 Championship in six months. This episode would air through Niconico as opposed to Ustream. At the end of the June 22 broadcast, Ice Ribbon officially announced the ending of the 19 O'Clock Girls ProWrestling program, although the promotion looked to hold future events on Niconico. As a result, the IW19 Championship was retired on July 14, 2013, when IW19 Champion Tsukasa Fujimoto defeated ICE×60 Champion Tsukushi in a championship unification match.

The title was reactivated with a tournament, held throughout May 2020, won by Hamuko Hoshi.

Like most professional wrestling championships, the title is won as a result of a scripted match. Tsukushi Haruka was the first champion in the title's history. Tsukasa Fujimoto, Kurumi and Hamuko Hoshi have had the most reigns as champion, all with two. Hoshi has also had the longest reign in the title's history at 246 days, while Hikari Minami's reign of five days was the shortest in the title's history. Overall, there have been 14 reigns shared among seven different wrestlers and two vacancies. Tsukushi Haruka was the final champion while in her fourth reign.

Reigns

Combined reigns

References

External links 
 Title history at IceRibbon.com
19Pro.ne07.jp
 IW-19 Championship

Ice Ribbon championships
Women's professional wrestling championships